The Gold Dust Orchestral Tour was a concert tour by American singer-songwriter Tori Amos in support of her compilation album Gold Dust. She was supported by the Metropole Orchestra in Europe, and by a String Octet from the Juilliard School in North America. Both North America dates were professionally recorded, with the New York City concert being streamed live by NPR Music and the Norfolk concert becoming part of the Infinity Hall Live TV series

Songs

Tour dates

References

2012 concert tours
Tori Amos concert tours